Bangladesh Tariff Commission (BTC) autonomous national statutory body that is responsible for placing tariffs on imports, protection of domestic industry, and the prevention of dumping of foreign goods in Bangladesh and is located in Dhaka, Bangladesh. Chairman of the Bangladesh Tariff Commission is Mahfuza Akter.

History
Bangladesh Tariff Commission traces its origin to the East Pakistan branch of Pakistan Tariff Commission, the commission was established on 28 July 1973. The commission is responsible for protection of domestic industry and regulation of import. The commission is weak according to its own commissioner. In 2007 it was accused by Federation of Bangladesh Chambers of Commerce and Industry of failing to stop the dumping of sugar Indian exporters.

Activities
The main task of the Bangladesh Tariff Commission is to protect the interests of domestic industries. The Company provides necessary assistance to the Government in negotiating and implementing international, bilateral, regional and multilateral trade agreements. Under the terms of the World Trade Organization (WTO), the commission works to protect, develop and expand local industries. Assisting the government in formulating working approaches for duty-free access to Bangladeshi goods at international level and free access to human resources. According to the application of the industrial organization or organization, the commission made recommendations on the analysis of production cost of the product, import of raw materials, cost of finished product, manpower, production capacity, value addition, quality of the product produced etc. The Commission uses a number of economic indicators to analyze the data.

References

External links 
 Bangladesh Tariff Commission

Government agencies of Bangladesh
1973 establishments in Bangladesh
Organisations based in Dhaka
Anti-dumping authorities
Foreign trade of Bangladesh
Customs duties
Government commissions of Bangladesh